Blakely Township is a township in Geary County, Kansas, USA.  As of the 2000 census, its population was 113.

Geography
According to the USGS, it contains three cemeteries: Salchow, Skiddy and Wetzel.

The stream of Thomas Creek runs through this township.

References
 USGS Geographic Names Information System (GNIS)

Further reading

External links
 City-Data.com

Townships in Geary County, Kansas
Townships in Kansas